Sonder Holdings Inc. manages short-term rentals, such as apartment hotels, in North America, Europe, and Dubai. It was founded in Montreal, Canada in 2014 and since 2016 has been based in San Francisco, California.

Sonder manages over 9,000 units in over 40 cities in 10 countries and has served over 1 million guests. It is the largest host on Airbnb. Although it competes with Airbnb, Sonder leases and manages its own rentals. It targets travelers who prefer larger accommodations than a hotel room but want a more predictable experience than renting from an amateur host. Guests use a mobile app to check in and get customer support. The company outsources maintenance and housekeeping services.

History
In 2012, to earn extra money, Francis Davidson, a student at McGill University, began subletting his own apartment and managing apartments of out-of-town students in the summers.

In 2014, Davidson and Lucas Pellan founded Flatbook, later renamed Sonder, and brought the company to FounderFuel, a startup accelerator in Montreal.

In 2019, Sonder announced projects in Dallas, Denver, Miami, New York City, and Philadelphia.

In March 2020, Sonder laid off 400 employees, one-third of its staff, due to the COVID-19 pandemic. Later that year, the company rehired some people who had been laid off. By June 2020, the company had raised over $550 million and was valued at $1.3 billion.

In January 2021, the company announced a planned expansion in Quebec, including hiring 700 employees there over the next five years. Sanjay Banker was named president of Sonder, in addition to his role of CFO, and Satyen Pandya was named CTO. In April 2021, Sonder reopened the Flatiron Hotel in Manhattan in April 2021, after signing a lease for the property in 2019.

In January 2022, the company became a public company via a merger with a special-purpose acquisition company. Also in January 2022, the company signed agreements to operate three properties in Washington, D.C. In June 2022, it was announced that the company would eliminate 21% of corporate roles and seven percent of frontline roles. Among those laid off was the company's CTO.

Controversies

Fines by Boston
The city of Boston fined Sonder $11,700 in December 2019 under a new law banning absentee landlords from short-term rentals. Sonder, which accounted for 39 of the 288 such fines in the city, appealed.

Neighbor opposition in Minneapolis
In 2019, the developer Sherman Associates agreed to reduce the number of units leased to Sonder in Minneapolis, Minnesota, after complaints from the neighbors regarding proliferation of short-term rental units.

References

External links
 
 

Hospitality companies established in 2014
2014 establishments in Quebec
Special-purpose acquisition companies
Apartment hotels
Companies listed on the Nasdaq
Hospitality companies of the United States
Travel and holiday companies of the United States
Vacation rental
Companies based in San Francisco